Banagram may refer to:

Banagram, Kamarhati, Nadia, West Bengal, India
Banagram, Paschim Bardhaman, West Bengal, India
Banagram Union, Katiadi, Kishoregonj, Bangladesh
Banagram Union, Morrelganj, Khulna, Bangladesh

See also
Bongram, Bangladesh